Estonia Piano Factory was founded in 1950 by  in Tallinn, Estonia. The majority of Estonia pianos are now sold in the United States.

History 
Ernst Hiis formed his own company, E. A. Ihse, in 1893. In 1915, he sold his business and worked for other companies. In 1923, he became the leading expert and manager of the Astron piano company. The Second World War and the subsequent occupation of Estonia by the Soviet Union stopped production of pianos in Estonia. The factories were destroyed. Only Ernst Hiis continued his grand piano production. In 1950, by the order of Joseph Stalin, based on The Peoples' Furniture Factory, the Tallinn Piano Factory was established, and the new piano was called Estonia. In April 1951, the first Estonia piano was presented to the State Board. From 1950 to 1990 the company was state-owned and made two grand piano models ( and ) for distribution throughout the Soviet Union.

The company languished after the fall of the Soviet Union and the restoration of Estonian independence in 1991, and in 1993 the factory was privatized to its managers. After the factory's decline in the early 1990s with the collapse of the Soviet Union, the firm was revived by Indrek Laul, who invested in the company and introduced its products to the United States.

Components and materials are now imported where appropriate, such as German Renner actions and hammers. In 2003 a new factory building was completed and opened.

Characteristics 
The Estonia pianos, manufactured during the existence of the Soviet Union, were surprisingly strong and could demonstrate excellent stability, fast mechanic and grand singing tone. Pianos from that period are very rare to find nowadays, almost being an extinct brand. After the fall of the Soviet Union, the new  pianos in the early 1990s were plagued by manufacturing defects. Those made since about 2002 have demonstrated remarkable quality and a unique, sweet singing tone. Additional improvements made in the years 2003–05 have placed the Estonia grand pianos in the highest or second-highest tier of quality, based upon the ranking system of Pianobuyer, a recognized reference in the piano industry.

Concert pianist Marc-André Hamelin, after choosing an Estonia piano for himself, commented, "The level of craftsmanship in the Estonia piano can only inspire the highest respect and I have no doubt that this piano will continue to prove essential to sensitive musicians."

Models 
Estonia's pianos are performance quality acoustic grand pianos manufactured in the Republic of Estonia.  Five models are currently offered for sale: 
 Model 168: 168 cm (5'6")
 Model 190: 190 cm (6'3")
 Model 210: 210 cm (6'10")
 Model 225: 225 cm (7'4")
 Grand Model 274: 274 cm (9'0")

References

External links

 
 Estonia's pianos increasingly symbolic of post-Soviet transformation. Deutsche Welle, 19-08-2011.

Piano manufacturing companies
Musical instrument manufacturing companies of Estonia
Economy of Tallinn
1950 establishments in Estonia
Companies established in 1950
Estonian brands
Musical instrument manufacturing companies of the Soviet Union